Trunovsky (masculine), Trunovskaya (feminine), or Trunovskoye (neuter) is the name of several rural localities in Russia:
Trunovskoye, Novosibirsk Oblast, a railway station in Barabinsky District of Novosibirsk Oblast
Trunovskoye, Stavropol Krai, a selo in Trunovsky Selsoviet of Trunovsky District of Stavropol Krai